The Quasimidi Rave-O-Lution 309 is a stand-alone groovebox produced by Quasimidi in 1996. It features an onboard sequencer and has the ability to mute parts during playback making this unit ideal for live performances. The machine features two oscillators for sound generation, (pulse, pulse variable, saw down, saw up, square, and triangle.)

Sounds
The Rave-O-Lution 309 contains analogue, electronic drum and bass synth sounds.

Sequencer
The unit features 100 preset and 100 user patterns.

Effects
The effects included with this machine are:

 Modulation
 Delay
 Reverb

Controls

Notable users
 Apollo 440
 Nine Inch Nails
 KMFDM

References

Further reading

Synthesizers
Grooveboxes